PEARL iZUMi (パールイズミ) is a company that produces sports apparel, primarily focusing on road cycling, track cycling, mountain biking, and triathlon.

It was founded in 1950 in Tokyo. PEARL iZUMi USA, Inc., is its U.S. distributor.

Ownership and distribution
DASH America (trading as PEARL iZUMi USA) purchased the trademark from Dave Jacobs (founder of Spyder, and the original distributor of PEARL iZUMi in the USA). A subsidiary of Shimano America, Inc., it holds the rights to do business as PEARL iZUMi in the US.  After several years of growth PEARL iZUMi USA, Inc., was purchased by Shimano for $70M in 2008 and sold to United Sports Brands in 2022. USB holds the rights to distribute the product everywhere in the world except Asia.

Sponsorships

PEARL iZUMi has sponsored many cycling teams, including the 1984 USA Olympic team. Other sponsored athletes include:  
 Mark Matthews (Mountain Bike)
 Marley Blonsky (Road & Gravel)
 Lael Wilcox (Ultra-distance)
 Jeff Lenosky (Mountain Bike)
 Brice Shirbach (Mountain Bike)
 Macky Franklin (Mountain Bike)
 Syd Schulz (Mountain Bike)
 Dillon Caldwell (Gravel)
 Angela Naeth (Triathlete & Gravel)
 Hannah Shell (Road & Gravel)
 Jake Magee (Road & Gravel)

References

External links
 Official link

Sporting goods manufacturers of the United States
Shoe brands
Sportswear brands
American companies established in 1984
Clothing companies established in 1984